Calfaria was one of the many Baptist chapels in Llanelli, Carmarthenshire, Wales.

Established in 1881, the original chapel was a modest red-brick building which cost £500 and was  opened in January 1882. Within seven years a new chapel was built, designed by George Morgan of Carmarthen. It flourished for over a century before closing in the early twenty-first century. The building is now derelict.

Early history

Founded in 1881, the first minister was James Griffiths, who moved to Calfaria, Aberdare in 1890.

Calfaria was much affected by the 1904-05 Religious Revival, during which a large number of prayer meetings were held. However, a prominent member was so overcome by the emotional impact of the Revival that he was removed to Carmarthen Asylum.

References

Bibliography

Llanelli, Calfaria
Churches in Llanelli
Former churches in Wales
Churches completed in 1882
Baptist churches in Wales
Llanelli, Calfaria